Ian Dawes (born 16 March 1984) is an English football manager who is currently assistant manager at EFL League Two side Tranmere Rovers.

Footballing career
Dawes was born in Liverpool, and played for Everton at schoolboy level before moving to Liverpool. After being released from Liverpool at 19 he then moved to Canada to play for Calgary Storm. Upon returning to Britain, he played for non-league clubs including Lancaster City and Marine. Whilst playing non league football he returned to former club Liverpool FC as an academy coach and spent ten years there before moving to Malta where he was head coach at Floriana. He then coached at Shrewsbury Town, and became head coach at Bangor City in November 2016.

He left Bangor in 2017, after just four months at the club, and later the same year joined Blackpool as first team coach. In August 2020, he moved to Tranmere Rovers as assistant to Mike Jackson, and took over as caretaker manager when Jackson was sacked in November 2020.  In his five games in charge, he led the club to four wins, including beating League One team, Accrington Stanley in the FA Cup, and a penalty shootout victory against Wigan Athletic in the EFL Trophy and was nominated as League Two Manager of the Month for November 2020.

Following Keith Hill's appointment as permanent manager of Tranmere Rovers, Dawes was installed as his assistant to ensure "consistency and continuity" according to Hill. Dawes was put back in charge of the team after Hill was dismissed on 11 May 2021.

Managerial statistics

Honours

Manager
Tranmere Rovers
League Two Manager of the Month - nominated for November 2020 following 5 wins from 5 games in all competitions, as caretaker manager.

References

1984 births
Living people
Tranmere Rovers F.C. managers
English footballers
English football managers
English Football League managers
Footballers from Liverpool
Lancaster City F.C. players
Marine F.C. players
Liverpool F.C. non-playing staff
Shrewsbury Town F.C. non-playing staff
Blackpool F.C. non-playing staff
Association football coaches
Tranmere Rovers F.C. non-playing staff
English expatriate footballers
English expatriate sportspeople in Canada
Expatriate soccer players in Canada
Association footballers not categorized by position